Wang Xiaohua may refer to:
Wang Xiaohua (politician), Chinese politician
Wang Xiaohua (handballer), Chinese handballer